Sleepless Nights is a 1932 British musical comedy film directed by Thomas Bentley and starring Stanley Lupino, Polly Walker and Gerald Rawlinson. The film was made at Elstree Studios by British International Pictures. Unlike most of Lupino's other films it was based on an original screenplay rather than an existing stage work.

Cast
Stanley Lupino as Guy Raynor
Polly Walker as Marjorie Drew
Gerald Rawlinson as Gerald Ventnor
Frederick Lloyd as Summers
Percy Parsons as Mr. Drew
Charlotte Parry as  Mrs. Drew
David Miller as Captain
Hal Gordon as Gendarme

Bibliography
Low, Rachael. History of the British Film: Filmmaking in 1930s Britain. George Allen & Unwin, 1985.

References

External links

1932 films
British musical comedy films
1932 musical comedy films
1930s English-language films
Films shot at British International Pictures Studios
Films directed by Thomas Bentley
British black-and-white films
1930s British films
Films set in Nice